Taisto Tähkämaa (born 1924) is a Finnish Centre Party politician who served at the Parliament and held various cabinet posts, including minister of defense and minister of agriculture and forestry in the 1970s and 1980s.

Biography
Tähkämaa was born in Pargas in 1924. He is an agrologist and agricultural advisor by profession. He is a war veteran and participated in World War II against Soviet Red Army. He was a member of the Centre Party and served as its vice chair between 1980 and 1984. He was elected to the Parliament on 23 March 1970 and served there until 21 March 1991.

Tähkämaa was appointed minister of defense on 15 May 1977 to the second cabinet of Kalevi Sorsa, and his tenure ended on 25 May 1979. Next day he was named as the minister of agriculture and forestry and served in the second cabinet of Mauno Koivisto until 18 February 1982. Tähkämaa continued to hold the same post in the third cabinet of Kalevi Sorsa from 19 February 1982 to 5 May 1983.

References

External links

1924 births
Living people
Ministers of Defence of Finland
Ministers of Agriculture of Finland
Members of the Parliament of Finland (1972–75)
Members of the Parliament of Finland (1975–79)
Members of the Parliament of Finland (1979–83)
Members of the Parliament of Finland (1987–91)
Members of the Parliament of Finland (1983–87)
Centre Party (Finland) politicians
Finnish agronomists
Finnish military personnel of World War II
People from Pargas